Dmytro Pundyk (born 26 April 1992) is a Ukrainian sabre fencer, team silver medallist in the 2010 European Fencing Championships and team gold medallist at the 2011 Summer Universiade. He has been named master of sports, international class in Ukraine.

His older sister Halyna is also a sabre fencer, team gold medallist at the 2008 Summer Olympics. They took up fencing together as children.

References

External links
 Profile  at the European Fencing Confederation

Ukrainian male sabre fencers
Universiade medalists in fencing
1989 births
Living people
Universiade gold medalists for Ukraine
Medalists at the 2011 Summer Universiade